WGAM (1250 AM) and WGHM (900 AM) are simulcasting radio stations broadcasting an oldies format named "Oldies Radio WGAM". WGAM is licensed to Manchester, New Hampshire, WGHM to Nashua, New Hampshire, United States. The stations serve southern New Hampshire. The stations are locally owned by Absolute Broadcasting, LLC.

History

WGAM

WGAM was previously known as WKBR, which had been a popular Top 40 music station  in earlier decades, then switched to carrying One on One Sports and a country music format then finally satellite delivered oldies.. On March 20, 2006, the station switched to sports radio with the slogan New Hampshire Sports Radio, WGAM, The Game.  Initially affiliated with Fox Sports Radio, the station switched to ESPN Radio in October 2009.

On July 3, 2017, WGAM and WGHM changed their format from ESPN sports to oldies, branded as "Oldies Radio WGAM".

WGHM

In the late 1990s and early 2000s, the station flipped formats several times, including oldies, both on their own and simulcasting WMEX from Farmington, New Hampshire . In 2004 the station carried Nashua Pride baseball games . Previous to the simulcast with WGAM, the station held the WGAM calls and carried ESPN Radio, however the network changed to Fox Sports Radio in 2006 and Absolute moved the WGAM calls to the more powerful 1250 frequency. Previous to the ESPN format, the station's call letters were WSNH. Other call signs held are WMVU and WOTW.

WGHM was originally the callsign of 1150 AM in Skowhegan, Maine (currently WSKW).

Shows
WGAM featured ESPN Radio programming such as Mike and Mike in the Morning, along with The Dan Patrick Show and some local programming; the station was also an affiliate for Boston Red Sox games, Boston Bruins games, Notre Dame Football games and Westwood One sports programming. Starting September 15, 2014, WGAM added the Glenn Ordway streaming show "Big Show Unfiltered" weekdays at 3p.m. After Ordway ended his show, the station returned to locally produced sports talk in the afternoons, early evenings and weekends. The station was known for devoting many hours per week covering local high school sports with play by play of individual games as well as a weekly compilation show featuring up to a dozen correspondents reporting live from high school games across the state. Several station alumni went on to prominent sports broadcasting careers including Mike Mutnansky, Rich Keefe and Christian Arcand on Boston's WEEI-FM.

In June 2012, WGAM and WGHM added three live, local sports talk programs to their weekday lineup.  The Home Team With Matt Perrault remained in the afternoon 3–6pm slot until March 2014.

Christian and King

Debuting in May 2012, "Christian And King" was hosted by Christian Arcand and long-time sportswriter for the Nashua Telegraph, Tom King. "Christian And King" aired weekdays from 12 to 3pm.

The Big Show Unfiltered

On September 15, 2014, The Big Show Unfiltered debuted as the afternoon drive program on ESPN New Hampshire. The show, hosted by Glenn Ordway, served as Ordway's return to terrestrial radio since his departure from WEEI-FM. The show was simulcast on SportsTalkBoston.com and Sirius/XM, and features a revolving cast of co-hosts and guests. "The Big Show Unfiltered" aired weekdays from 3 to 6pm.

High School Insiders

Hosted Nick Anastos

Friday Night Lights

WGAM ran a weekly high school football wrap-around show every Friday from 6 to 11pm during the season. Nick Anastos and Rich Flerra anchor in-studio while numerous correspondents from games all over the state call in with live scores and updates.

Granite State Golf Show debuted April 3, 2016. The show hosted by George Slyman aired Saturday mornings from 9–10. Covers PGA, Euro, LPGA, State, Regional and local golf topics. Special guests were often invited in-studio or on scheduled calls.

Sports Variety Society

Debuted April 12, 2016 as an evening sports, pop culture and current events show. It ran every Thursday night from 7-8 during the Red Sox Season. Hosted by Chris DeTurk and featured a rotating team of co-hosts including Doug & Jeff Starbird, Paul Alphen, and the Chris Emery Band. The show featured various comedic bits and took live phone calls.

Previous logo

References

External links

GAM
Manchester, New Hampshire
Nashua, New Hampshire
Hillsborough County, New Hampshire
Radio stations established in 1946
1946 establishments in New Hampshire
Oldies radio stations in the United States